Thomas Curtis Bush (February 6, 1928 – February 4, 2003) was an American actor. He was born in Orange County, California.

He frequently worked with Sam Peckinpah, appearing in The Getaway, The Killer Elite and Convoy. Other films he appeared in include Ed Wood, Cobb, Crimson Tide, Mars Attacks!, Con Air, Rush Hour and Dr. Dolittle 2. He appeared in such TV series as T.J. Hooker and Simon & Simon. He played Deputy Sturgess on Bret Maverick. He died on February 4, 2003, in Los Angeles, California, two days before his 75th birthday.

Partial filmography
The Getaway (1972) - Cowboy's Helper 
The Killer Elite (1975) - Sam the Mechanic
Convoy (1978) - Chief Stacey Love 
Indecent Proposal (1993) - David's Father
Ed Wood (1994) - Stage Manager
Cobb (1994) - Rogers Hornsby
Crimson Tide (1995) - Admiral Williams
A Family Thing (1996) - Old Man
Mars Attacks! (1996) - Hillbilly
Con Air (1997) - Fresno Sheriff Ted Grasso
Rush Hour (1998) - Bomb Practice Sergeant
Crime and Punishment in Suburbia (2000) - Chief Judson
Dr. Dolittle 2 (2001) - Farmer (final film role)

References
Tommy Bush at Aveleyman

External links
 

1928 births
2003 deaths
20th-century American male actors
Male actors from California